Ear protection refers to devices used to protect the ear, either externally from elements such as cold, intrusion by water and other environmental conditions, debris. High levels of exposure to noise may result in noise-induced hearing loss. Devices for that purpose are called hearing protection devices.  

Noise reduction
Occupational safety and health
Protective gear
Noise control